Snydertown is an unincorporated community located within East Amwell Township in Hunterdon County, New Jersey, United States. The settlement is located on the southern face of Sourland Mountain at the intersection of Linvale Road and Snydertown Road. In the past, a mill operated in Snydertown.

References

East Amwell Township, New Jersey
Unincorporated communities in Hunterdon County, New Jersey
Unincorporated communities in New Jersey